Quincy (formerly, Quinsy) is a census-designated place and the county seat of Plumas County, California. The population was 1,630 during the 2020 Census, down from 1,728 during the 2010 Census, and 1,879 during the 2000 Census.

History
Quincy is on the current and ancestral lands of the Maidu people. Quincy started as a Gold Rush town, associated with the former Elizabethtown, California. Started in 1852, Elizabethtown slowly faded.

Development moved a mile away into the American Valley after settler James H. Bradley, who helped organize Plumas County, donated land there for the county seat. He laid out the town and named it after his farm in Illinois that had been named for John Quincy Adams (1767–1848), the sixth president of the United States (1825–1829).

The Quincy post office opened in 1855, and the town was formally recognized in 1858.

Geography and climate
Quincy is located at  (39.936279, −120.947921).

Quincy is underlain by metasedimentary rock of the Shoo Fly Complex. Its dominant silica-rich clastic material weathers to a stony coarse soil which includes the well or somewhat excessively drained alluvial fan material (mainly Forgay very gravelly sandy loam) on which most of Quincy's businesses and homes have been built. Cultivated land north of the residential area lies on poorly drained loam, silt loam or fine sandy loam.

Quincy has a Mediterranean climate (Köppen Csb) though its inland location and altitude makes it more continental and wetter than usual for this type, with very heavy snowfalls sometimes occurring in winter – the record being  in the very wet January 1916. Although summer days are hot and only 1.4 days per winter fail to top , nights can be very cold and frosts occur on 179 days per year and have been recorded even in July.

Demographics

2010
At the 2010 census Quincy had a population of 1,728. The racial makeup of Quincy was 1,500 (86.8%) White, 132 people (7.6%) Hispanic or Latino of any race, 37 (2.1%) Black, 29 (1.7%) Native American, 19 (1.1%) Asian, 2 (0.1%) Pacific Islander, 66 (3.8%) from other races, and 75 (4.3%) from two or more races.

The census reported that 1,673 people (96.8% of the population) lived in households, no one lived in non-institutionalized group quarters and 55 (3.2%) were institutionalized.

There were 798 households, 183 (22.9%) had children under the age of 18 living in them, 300 (37.6%) were opposite-sex married couples living together, 85 (10.7%) had a female householder with no husband present, 28 (3.5%) had a male householder with no wife present. There were 63 (7.9%) unmarried opposite-sex partnerships, and 5 (0.6%) same-sex married couples or partnerships. 314 households (39.3%) were one person and 93 (11.7%) had someone living alone who was 65 or older. The average household size was 2.10. There were 413 families (51.8% of households); the average family size was 2.77.

The age distribution was 341 people (19.7%) under the age of 18, 163 people (9.4%) aged 18 to 24, 350 people (20.3%) aged 25 to 44, 556 people (32.2%) aged 45 to 64, and 318 people (18.4%) who were 65 or older. The median age was 45.5 years. For every 100 females, there were 84.2 males. For every 100 females age 18 and over, there were 81.1 males.

There were 872 housing units at an average density of 205.7 per square mile, of the occupied units 388 (48.6%) were owner-occupied and 410 (51.4%) were rented. The homeowner vacancy rate was 2.7%; the rental vacancy rate was 5.5%. 872 people (50.5% of the population) lived in owner-occupied housing units and 801 people (46.4%) lived in rental housing units.

2000

At the 2000 census there were 1,879 people, 858 households, and 479 families in the CDP. The racial makeup of the CDP was 90.9% White, 4.8% were Hispanic or Latino of any race, 1.5% African American, 2.2% Native American, 0.8% Asian, 0.1% Pacific Islander, 1.5% from other races, and 3.0% from two or more races.

Of the 858 households 27.3% had children under the age of 18 living with them, 40.2% were married couples living together, 12.7% had a female householder with no husband present, and 44.1% were non-families. 38.7% of households were one person and 13.8% were one person aged 65 or older. The average household size was 2.13 and the average family size was 2.79.

The age distribution was 23.9% under the age of 18, 8.6% from 18 to 24, 24.3% from 25 to 44, 25.8% from 45 to 64, and 17.4% 65 or older. The median age was 41 years. For every 100 females, there were 89.2 males. For every 100 females age 18 and over, there were 87.2 males.

The median household income was $30,508 and the median family income was $40,536. Males had a median income of $38,438 versus $27,411 for females. The per capita income for the CDP was $19,944. About 5.1% of families and 11.1% of the population were below the poverty line, including 11.3% of those under age 18 and 2.8% of those age 65 or over.

Education

Quincy's students attend the Quincy Elementary School and Quincy Junior-Senior High School. The schools come under the authority of the Plumas County Board of Education and the Plumas Unified School District. The 'Trojans' are the mascot for the Quincy Junior-Senior High School.

Government

Notable people

 Cody Anderson, MLB pitcher for the Cleveland Indians
Craig Brandt, member of the New Mexico Senate
Louise Clappe, known as Dame Shirley; diarist who settled in Quincy during the Gold Rush; the town square is named for her
 Jason Ellison, former MLB outfielder
 Claire Cayot O'Rourke, supercentenarian and the first woman to hold public office in the state of California
Ulysses S. Webb, 19th Attorney General of California

References

External links

Quincy California Chamber of Commerce Portal style website, Government, Business, Library, Recreation and more
News from Quincy
Feather River Bulletin – Local newspaper
City-Data.com Comprehensive Statistical Data and more about Quincy

 
Census-designated places in Plumas County, California
County seats in California
Populated places in the Sierra Nevada (United States)
Census-designated places in California